Polygamous marriages may be legally contracted in the nation of Comoros.

References

Comoros